Katherine Margaret Ellis (born 22 September 1977) is a former Australian politician, who represented the Division of Adelaide in the Australian House of Representatives for the Australian Labor Party from 2004 until 2019. She served in multiple portfolios in the outer ministry of the 2007–2013 federal Labor government and was in the shadow cabinet after that. In March 2017 Ellis announced that she would step down from shadow cabinet as of the next reshuffle and leave parliament at the 2019 federal election.

Early life and career
Ellis was born in Melbourne and grew up in rural South Australia in the Murray River town of Mannum where her mother worked as a teacher at the local primary school. Ellis moved to Adelaide for her secondary education, attending Daws Road High School. She enrolled but left without completing a Bachelor of International Studies at Flinders University.  While enrolled at Flinders she was General Secretary of the Students Association and an editor of Empire Times. A member of the Australian Labor Party, she worked as a research officer for state and federal parliamentarians. Ellis is linked with the Shop, Distributive and Allied Employees Association (SDA). She was a ministerial adviser to South Australian state minister Rory McEwen and then for the former Deputy Premier of South Australia, Kevin Foley.

Political career
Ellis was elected to the House of Representatives for the Division of Adelaide, South Australia at the 2004 federal election, defeating Liberal Party incumbent Trish Worth on a 2 percent two-party swing to a margin of 1.3 points, increasing to 8.5 points in 2007. The margin was reduced to 7.7 points in 2010 and to 4.0 percent in 2013.

After the 2007 election Ellis became Minister for Youth and Minister for Sport. This made her the youngest person to become an Australian government minister, a record until then held by former Prime Minister Paul Keating. In 2009 Ellis took on the portfolio of Early Childhood Education, Childcare and Youth. After the 2010 election, Ellis became the Minister for Employment Participation and Early Childhood and Childcare and the Minister for the Status of Women. For a few months prior to the 2013 Labor government defeat, Ellis was the Minister for Early Childhood, Childcare and Youth. Ellis was then elevated to shadow cabinet with the portfolios of Education and Early Childhood.

In 2012 Ellis voted in support of a same-sex marriage bill. She supported the Safe School Coalition Australia program in 2016.

Personal life
On 23 February 2013, Ellis married News Limited journalist David Penberthy, then the editor-in-chief of news.com.au and a columnist for several News Limited publications and previously the editor of Sydney's Daily Telegraph. Ellis gave birth to her first child in April 2015 and a second in July 2017. Ellis supports the Adelaide Football Club and was named as a club ambassador in 2009. In 2011, she joined tennis star Lleyton Hewitt as the club's number-one ticket holder, becoming the first woman so honoured. She is also a Club Ambassador for the SANFL team the Glenelg Tigers.

Ellis's public image has been the subject of media attention since her entry into public life. In October 2008, she was voted Parliament's "sexiest" MP in a poll of federal MPs conducted by The Courier-Mail newspaper. In April 2010, she modelled a Karen Millen dress and Gucci high-heels for Grazia magazine. She agreed to do the shoot to raise awareness of the pressures on women related to body image, and to encourage fashion magazines to promote healthy attitudes toward weight and eating.

On 9 March 2017, Ellis announced that she would step down from shadow cabinet as of the next reshuffle, and leave parliament at the 2019 federal election in order to spend more time with her young family. A week later, it was announced that she was in the early stages of her second pregnancy, and her second son was born in July 2017.

In April 2021, her book, Sex, Lies and Question Time, was published by Hardie Grant.

See also
 First Rudd Ministry
 First Gillard Ministry
 Second Gillard Ministry
 Second Rudd Ministry

References

External links
 KateEllis.com.au Official website
 Parliamentary Profile: Labor website
 
 

Australian Labor Party members of the Parliament of Australia
Labor Right politicians
Members of the Australian House of Representatives for Adelaide
Members of the Australian House of Representatives
Government ministers of Australia
Women members of the Australian House of Representatives
Flinders University alumni
1977 births
Living people
Women government ministers of Australia
21st-century Australian politicians
21st-century Australian women politicians